Richard Erle-Drax-Grosvenor (born Grosvenor; 5 October 1762 – 8 February 1819) was a British politician.

Born a member of the Grosvenor family now headed by the Duke of Westminster, he was the son of Thomas Grosvenor, second son of Sir Robert Grosvenor, 6th Baronet. His mother was Deborah, daughter of Stephen Skynner, while Field Marshal Thomas Grosvenor was his younger brother.

Erle-Drax-Grosvenor was returned to parliament as one of two representatives for Clitheroe in 1794, a seat he held until 1796. In 1802 he was elected Member of Parliament for Chester (succeeding his younger brother Thomas), which constituency he represented until 1807. He returned once again to the House of Commons in 1818 when he was returned for New Romney, a seat he held until his death the following year. He was High Sheriff of Dorset for 1800–01.

Erle-Drax-Grosvenor died in February 1819, aged 56. He had married Frances, daughter and heiress of Edward Drax, of Charborough Park, Dorset, in 1788, and assumed the additional surnames of Erle-Drax on inheriting Charborough Park on the death of Edward Drax in 1791. They had a son and two daughters. His son, Richard, succeeded him as MP for New Romney.

References

External links 
 
 

1762 births
1819 deaths
Richard
Members of the Parliament of Great Britain for English constituencies
British MPs 1790–1796
Members of the Parliament of the United Kingdom for English constituencies
UK MPs 1802–1806
UK MPs 1806–1807
UK MPs 1818–1820
Ernle family
High Sheriffs of Dorset